Lantapan, officially the Municipality of Lantapan (Bukid and Higaonon: Banuwa ta Lantapan;), is a 1st class municipality in the province of Bukidnon, Philippines. According to the 2020 census, it has a population of 65,974 people.

Lantapan is known as the “vegetable basket” of Mindanao.

It used to be a barrio of Malaybalay until its creation, by virtue of Republic Act No. 4787 enacted on 18 June 1968, as a separate municipality.

Geography
The town is on a plateau in the heart of Bukidnon, situated between the Kalatungan and Kitanglad Mountain Ranges, after which its native name of "lantapan" was derived which means "level-on-top".

Lantapan is bounded on the north by the municipalities of Sumilao and Impasugong; east by Malaybalay City; south by Valencia City; and west by Talakag.

It has an aggregate area of 318.2 km2, mostly agriculture and forest lands. It has six river channels and 40 creeks and springs traversing across different points in the landscape. Lantapan is strategically located between two cities of Bukidnon, Malaybalay and Valencia. It can be reached via Aglayan crossing, which is a potential convergent zone of four cities: Iligan, Butuan, Davao and Cagayan de Oro.

Flora and fauna
Lantapan's virgin forests are home to a diverse variety of flora and fauna. There are orchids, berries, pitcher plants, lichens, and a host of other wild flowers. A number of mammal species also thrive in the dense forests, including squirrels, monkeys, bats, flying lemurs, deer, tarsiers and wild pigs among others. The Philippine eagle (Pithecophaga jefferyi) along with other bird species such as the serpent eagle and sparrow hawk takes its home within the Mt. Kitanglad Range.

Climate

The climatic condition of Lantapan is relatively cool and humid for Philippine standards with winds blowing at a northward direction. The temperature around noon tends to be 5-7 °C cooler than nearby coastal areas to the north. November to April is relatively dry and May brings the start of the rains which continue 'til October. Mountains of neighboring towns in the north protect it from cyclone storms.

Barangays
Lantapan is politically subdivided into 14 barangays and 68 sitios.

Demographics

Originally, the Talaandig were the main inhabitants of Lantapan. Then, migrants from the Visayas and northern Luzon started to settle in the area, even during the Spanish colonial period. More inflow took place after the Second World War. This stream of settlers eventually led to the varied mix of ethnic groups in Lantapan. Visayan is the predominant language, followed by Binukid. 2010 Census showed Lantapan's population have reached 55,934 with the Poblacion as the most populated barangay. Its population growth rate between 1980 and 1990 of 4.18% was well above the national rate of 2.3 percent.

The Tala’andig (one of the 7 tribes of Bukidnon) Ancestral Territory is native to Barangay Songco, where the tribal ways and customary law is tried to be revived and preserved.  A school for living tradition was built as an avenue for elders to teach the young the traditional Tala’andig way of life, including its history, rituals, music, arts, embroidery, dance, and literature. Other activities involved earth paintings (painting utilizing soil as a medium), singing and dancing to traditional music, and making musical instruments and indigenous accessories among others.

Economy

Agriculture

Lantapan has agri-based economy. Farming has remained a dominant economic activity among the Lantapanons. The major crops grown are corn, coffee, cabbage and potatoes, sugarcane and other high valued crops and bananas also becoming an important commercial crop.

Lantapan is also home to two banana plantations: the Mount Kitanglad Agri-Ventures Inc. (MKAVI) and the Dole Banana Plantation with thousands of hectares of lands in the highland-barangays of the town planted with export quality bananas. The plantations started their operation in 1998 with thousand of residents of the municipality employed.

Commerce

There are 428 commercial establishments registered at the Licensing Division of the municipality, 15 of which are classified under agro-industrial, manufacturing and servicing. Trading activities include wholesale buying of corn, coffee and vegetables by traders from within Lantapan, neighboring towns in Bukidnon and Cagayan de Oro.

Finance

For finance, the informal credit or "suki" system prevails. In this arrangement, the trader is usually the "suki" who provides credit too and buys the products of the farmer. A few cooperatives in some barangays also extend small loans to their members. An Asian Hills Bank located at the Poblacion and established in 1978, is owned by a private corporation. Its portfolio includes agricultural, commercial and real estate loans.

Tourism

Kitanglad Mountain Range The Kitanglad Mountain Range is a very significant landmark in the cultural history of the indigenous peoples of Bukidnon with Mount Dulang-dulang considered as a sacred place. Being an ancestral domain, permission to enter must be secured from the tribal leaders of the Tala’andig tribe of Lantapan in deference to the Free Prior and Informed Consent (FPIC) mandated under the IPRA Law.

The long trek to Mount Dulang-dulang’s summit goes through virgin dense forests, home to old trees covered with moss and lichens. At the highest peak, there is a panoramic view of the entire Kitanglad range, and on clear days, the distant Mount Apo.

Cinchona Forest Reserve The Cinchona Forest Reserve was established through a presidential proclamation in 1936, and now forms part of the protected area of the Mount Kitanglad Range Natural Park. It is home to the Cinchona Plantation, established at Barangay Kaatuan in 1929, and said to be the only of its kind left in Asia and the Pacific where the medicinal plant Cinchona (Cinchona ledgeriana) is grown. Cinchona, is a medium-sized tropical tree that can grow up  with a  diameter, is a source of quinine that is used for malaria treatment. The farm covers an area of  where 7 Cinchona tree species are found and is planted mostly with Albizza falcataria (= Falcataria moluccana) and other medicinal trees.

Binahon Agro-forestry Farm The Binahon Agro-forestry Farm, located at Sitio Bol-ogan, Barangay Songco, on the slopes of Mt. Kitanglad, is a learning institution for farmers, agriculturists, and rural development workers. Fruit trees are also planted in the area with vegetables sown in between. Farm animals such as carabaos, horse, goats, sheep, hogs and other livestock animals are grown in the farm together with honeybees and tilapia. The farm also offers facilities for lodging to visiting tourists, researchers, scientists and mountaineers.

Barangay Kaatuan is also home to 8 conjoint water falls: 7 water falls pouring its contents onto another water falls.  This conjoint waterfall is supplied by the Kulasihan River, and situated five kilometers from the barangay proper of Kaatuan called Block 2.

Infrastructure

Health services

The rural health unit (RHU) maintains one central health unit and 14 barangay health stations. The RHU provides medical, dental, family planning and laboratory services. Recently, it has started to provide special care and rehabilitation to malnourished children. One privately owned clinic for urgent care on minor cases and two registered mini-pharmaceutical stores are found in the Poblacion.

Water

Potable water is distributed through individual installations of 3,958 households. A feasibility study is being developed for the establishments of an improved and modern water system for Lantapan which entails tapping the Kulasihan and Songco water sources for an estimated flow of 45,018.168 cubic meter per hour.

Security

Lantapan is generally peaceful. Security in the area is ably maintained by the local police force. Trained civilian forces, the "Bantay-Bayan" and the Civilian Volunteer Organization (CVO) in the barangays also provide support to crime prevention.

Education

Presently, there is a total of 24 primary, elementary and secondary schools in Lantapan.  These schools serve approximately 7,000 children. Day care centers under the Department of Social Welfare and Development provide preparatory education to pre-schoolers in the barangays.

References

External links

 [ Philippine Standard Geographic Code]
Philippine Census Information

Municipalities of Bukidnon